A kaunakes ( or ;) or persis was a woollen mantle associated with ancient Mesopotamia and Persia. It was woven in a tufted pattern suggesting overlapping petals or feathers, either by sewing tufts onto the garment or by weaving loops into the fabric.

Background
The origin of this dress is traced to the Sumerian civilization which existed even before 4,000 BC.

Pre-Dynastic period (4000-2700 BC): kilts and "net-dresses"

The earliest type of dress attested in early Sumerian art is not the kaunakes, but rather a sort of kilt or "net dress" which is quite closely fitting the lower body, while the upper body remains bare. This early type of net dress looks much more similar to standard textile than the later kaunakes , which looks more like sheepskin with ample bell-shaped volume around the waist and the legs.

Early Dynastic Period (2700-2350 BC): kaunakes
The Early Dynastic Period between 2,700 and 2,350 BC was marked by high culture. The dress was a unisex garment which both men and women wore. The skirt was made from sheepskin and was worn with the skin turned inside and with tufts ornamented like a toothed-comb over the wool. It was used in the form of a wraparound skirt tied and worn from the waist extending to the knees. Servants and soldiers wore the shortest garments, while persons of high status wore longer ones with the skirt often extending down to the ankles. The upper part of the body was either covered with another sheepskin cloak spread across the shoulders, or left bare. It was only around 2,500 BC that the sheepskin garment was replaced by a textile made of woven wool; however the tuft part of the dress was continued in the form of "sewing tufts onto the garment or by weaving loops into the fabric". The Greek called this dress kaunakes. This type of dress is featured in sculptures and mosaics of this period.

History

In a Sumerian image dated between 2,900 and 2,600 BC, the dress was worn as a pagne, which was a simple fleece pelt used as body wrap but retaining the tail part. In some images the wraparound covered the body crossed over the left shoulder. Following the discovery of weaving, kaunakes were designed with tufts of wool stitched into the cloth to "simulate the curling fleece fur". It was a rustic fabric made of sheepskin, camel or goat's hide fashioned in the form of a shawl or skirts called the "thick blanket" that evolved to suit the severe weather conditions of the Sumerian and Akkadian Mesopotamian region.

It is also believed that kaunakes, as a fashioned fleece, while not mentioned prior to 300 BC could be traced to the 400–300 BC. During the Greek period of Aristophanes the garment was made from goat's hair or wool in the style of a weighty mantle or cape. Coptic Egypt, not Mesopotamia, is credited with the original design of woven tapestry with projecting long locks or strands of wool. Its manufacture evolved into kaunakes when the woven fringe design began to mirror the original fleece and fur and was shaped as a mantle. These were worn during the winter season as a shawl over the shoulders, and during summer adapted as a skirt. Over the centuries many designs evolved with sleeves, then variants were made with cloth instead of fleece, and eventually, it evolved back to a cape sans sleeves.

In Athens, initially the dress was thought to be of Persian origin but later it came to be identified as a Babylonian garment, as it matched with the textile practices of the northeast from Mesopotamia. Part of the confusion arose from the naming of the garment, because the root word is linguistically closer to Iranian language, rather than Babylonian language. The dress was also used by a stage actor in a drama scene of Aristophanes' Wasps in Athens, as the design of the exotic dress suited the dramatic effect in view of it being "visually distinctive", heavy and with small decorative tufts. It was the Athenians' belief that the kaunakes was of Persian origin and not from Babylon from an understanding that the dress was an exported item and could have originated from Anatolia (Kilikia or Phrygia), the Levant (Phoenicia or Syria), or Mesopotamia (Babylon), which were all part of the Persian Empire in the fifth century BC.

Purpose
An image dated to about 3rd millennium BC from the Temple of Ishtar at Mari, Tell Hariri, in Syria shows kaunakes wrapped as a cloak around the shoulders of an alabaster image of a woman in a seated posture; the kaunakes is inferred as made from goat hair or wool. From 2,450 BC, it was a royal dress, as seen from the figures in prayer mode in Mesopotamia. In this, the dress was formed with woolly tufts laid successively in horizontal lines and suspended vertically. It was fashioned generally as a woman's dress, adorning the left arm and shoulder with the right side exposing the skin and the breast.

References

Bibliography

Further reading

External links

Sumer
History of fashion
Skirts